Theresa Sareo is a New York-based singer/songwriter. In June 2002 she was struck by an impaired driver and her injuries forced the amputation of her right leg. Since the accident she has also become a motivational speaker, and has appeared on CNN's Larry King Live and in New York Magazine. She has released three self-produced albums, an eponymous debut in 1998, Embrace in 2000, and, after the accident, 2005's Alive Again.  She performs and speaks regularly for the United States Military, and at hospitals, schools and corporations worldwide. Theresa has also written and performed music for Former Secretary of State, Hillary Rodham Clinton, and was a keynote speaker at a national press conference on health care in 2007 with then NY Senators Clinton and Charles Schumer.

After composing the song "Through A Soldier's Eyes," Sareo is noted for becoming the first civilian performer to sing the National Anthem at Walter Reed Army Hospital in Washington, D.C. and at the U.S. Army Warrior Transition Units; European Command, sponsored by the Army's Dept. of Ministries.

Her documentary film "Theresa Sareo: Alive Again" chronicles the story of her life and career and has garnished "Audience Choice for Best Documentary" (2012 Gasparilla International Film Festival—Tampa) and "Best Director of a Documentary (2012 NY International Film Festival—L.A. Edition) awards. It is produced by Evan Ginzburg, first-time director Rye Joseph and Ms. Sareo.

External links
 TheresaSareo.com
 /AliveAgainMovie.com Theresa's official movie website
 New York Cool interview with Theresa Sareo
 Crash On the corner of 34th and Park Ave. (New York Metro feature)

American motivational speakers
Women motivational speakers
American singer-songwriters
American women singer-songwriters
American amputees
Year of birth missing (living people)
Living people
21st-century American women